Punya Nagari is a Marathi language daily newspaper published in Maharashtra. It was established in 1999 by Muralidhar Shingote. According to the Audit Bureau of Circulations, its average circulation is 416,625. Punya Nagari newspaper is published from Mumbai, Nashik, Nanded, Pune, Ahmednagar, Thane, Nagpur, Dhule, Jalgaon, Kolhapur, Latur, Akola, Amravati, Aurangabad, Satara and Solapur.

References

External links 

 Official website

Newspapers published in Mumbai
Newspapers published in Maharashtra
Daily newspapers published in India
Marathi-language newspapers